Protoclythia californica is a species of flat-footed flies in the family Platypezidae.

References

Platypezidae
Insects described in 1950
Taxa named by Edward L. Kessel